Paolo Luigioni (9 February 1873, Rome – 6 May 1937, Rome) was an Italian entomologist.
Luigioni was a Rome University  professor and Curator of the Museo Civico di Zoologia di Roma where the main his collection is kept. Other parts are in the Natural History Museum in Pescasseroli.

He specialised in the Coleoptera, Hemiptera, and other insects of the Abruzzi, now a National Park (Parco Nazionale d'Abruzzo, Lazio e Molise.

References 
 Conci, C. 1975: Repertorio delle biografie e bibliografie degli scrittori e cultori italiani di entomologia. Mem. Soc. Ent. Ital. 48 1969(4):945-946.

Italian entomologists
1873 births
1937 deaths